Cécile Miguel (19 March 1921 - 2001) was a Belgian artist and writer.

She was born in Gilly. Miguel received the Prix de la Jeune Peinture Française in 1950 and took part in an exhibition in Lucerne where works by Picasso and Joan Miró also appeared. In 1945, she married André Miguel. She began writing in collaboration with her husband in 1976.

Selected works 
 L’oeil dans la bouche, poetry (1978) with André Miguel
 Alphabet des astres, poetry (1979), with André Miguel
 Je ne sais pas ce qui, play with André Miguel
 Ça fait comme des paroles, play with André Miguel
 Sonnez et entrez, poetry (1981), with André Miguel
 Le ver de l’enfer, novel (1982), with André Miguel
 Dans l’autre scène, poetry (1984), with André Miguel
 Orée, poetry (1989), with André Miguel
 Au creu des apparences, poetry (1989)
 Facies-escargot franchissant les monts du Sommeil (1990)
 Au royaume d’ombre (1990)

References 

1921 births
2001 deaths
20th-century Belgian women artists
Belgian women poets
Belgian women novelists
Writers from Charleroi
Artists from Charleroi